Hélio Justino (born 23 July 1972) is a Brazilian handball player who competed in the 2004 Summer Olympics and in the 2008 Summer Olympics.

References

1972 births
Living people
Brazilian male handball players
Olympic handball players of Brazil
Handball players at the 2004 Summer Olympics
Handball players at the 2008 Summer Olympics
Handball players at the 2003 Pan American Games
Handball players at the 2007 Pan American Games
Pan American Games medalists in handball
Pan American Games gold medalists for Brazil
Medalists at the 2007 Pan American Games
21st-century Brazilian people